Midara balbalasanga is a moth of the subfamily Arctiinae. It was described by Schaus in 1928. It is found in the Philippines.

References

 Natural History Museum Lepidoptera generic names catalog

Arctiinae
Moths described in 1928